Carlos Costa was the defending champion, but lost in the first round this year.

Andrei Medvedev won the tournament, beating Karel Nováček in the final, 6–4, 6–2.

Seeds

Draw

Finals

Top half

Bottom half

References

External links
 Main draw

Singles